Sir Lyonel Felix Carteret Eugene Tollemache, 4th Baronet (15 January 1854 – 4 March 1952) was an English landowner.

Early life and family
Born in South Witham near Grantham, Lincolnshire, he was the eldest son of the Reverend Ralph Tollemache and his first wife and cousin, Caroline Tollemache. Ralph was noted for the increasingly eccentric names given to his numerous offspring.

Tollemache graduated from Jesus College, Cambridge. He married Hersilia Henrietta Diana Oliphant (or Collingwood) in 1881 and they had three daughters and three sons, all born in Eastbourne:
 Cecil Lyonel Newcomen Tollemache, 5th Baronet (4 March 1886 – 31 March 1969)
 Beryl Hersilia Tollemache (1887–8 June 1944)
 Cynthia Joan Caroline Tollemache (1890–31 January 1988)
 Lieutenant John Eadred Tollemache (28 July 1892 – 21 August 1916) B.A. Magdalene College, Cambridge. Joined the 6th Battalion The Queen's (Royal West Surrey Regiment) and died whilst attached to the 8th Battalion in the Somme.
 Sibell Agnes Tollemache (1895–7 June 1954)
 Maj.-Gen. Sir Humphrey Thomas Tollemache, 6th Baronet (10 August 1897 – 1990)

Baronetage
On the death of his second cousin, William Tollemache, 9th Earl of Dysart, 3rd Baronet, he succeeded to the baronetage in 1935 at the age of 81. He inherited Dysart's holding in Buckminster estate and the entirety of Ham House with the surrounding land and property in Petersham, Ham and Canbury and the gravel works at Ham. Tollemache and his middle-aged bachelor son, Cecil, moved into Ham House. The Dysart title and other estates were passed to Dysart's niece, Wenefryde Scott.

World War II
The father and son duo increasingly struggled to maintain Ham House, especially as the outbreak of war reduced the availability of labour. The nearby Leyland military vehicle and munitions factory was a local target and bombs fell near the house. Tollemache moved most of the valuable furniture and artworks from the house to the country for safekeeping. The family deeds and papers, some dating back to the 14th century, were placed in deep vaults in Chancery Lane. Although they survived the Blitz, they were damaged by flooding from fire hoses and were thought to have been destroyed. Many were recovered from the Ham House Stables in 1953 and transferred to The National Archives.

Post-war

After the war, in 1948, Tollemache and his son donated Ham House and its gardens to the National Trust, a plan that had been under consideration since James Lees-Milne's visit in March 1943. Tollemache and his son moved to Langham House on Ham Common, one of the many Tollemache properties in the area.
In 1949, Buckminster Estates Ltd, the Tollemache's company established in 1936, sold the remaining Tollemache interests in the area by auction in 124 lots comprising  land, 41 residences, 99 cottages, a farm, 4 shops, 2 licensed premises, freehold ground rents and building plots and the sand and gravel works. Lyonel remained in Langham House, Ham until his death in 1952. Hersilia died in 1953. The baronetage passed to Cecil, and, on his death, to the youngest son, Humphrey. 

He is buried at St Peter's Church, Petersham.

References

1854 births
1952 deaths
Alumni of Jesus College, Cambridge
Baronets in the Baronetage of Great Britain
Burials at St Peter's, Petersham
People from Grantham
Lyonel Felix Carteret Tollemache, 4th Baronet